The Madom Gröss is a mountain in the Lepontine Alps of Switzerland. It is located between the Valle Verzasca and Valle Leventina, near Sonogno, Ticino.

References

External links
 Madom Gröss on Summitpost
 Madom Gröss on Hikr

Mountains of the Alps
Mountains of Switzerland
Mountains of Ticino
Lepontine Alps